Line 500 is one of Căile Ferate Române's main lines in Romania, having a total length of . The main line, connecting Bucharest with the Ukrainian border near Chernivtsi, passes through the important cities of Ploiești, Buzău, Focșani, Adjud, Bacău, Roman, Pașcani, and Suceava.

Secondary lines

References

Railway lines in Romania
Standard gauge railways in Romania